Yulia Pavlova(born 25 April 1994) is a Russian fashion model who currently lives in Saint Petersburg, Russia.

Biography

Born in Pskov, Pskov Oblast, Russia, Pavlova debuted on the runway during Milan Fashion Week Fall/ Winter 2015 -2016 walking for Gucci show.

Lia has a twin sister Viktoria, who is also a model.

References

External links 
Lia Pavlova in Dom Models MAG
Lia Pavlova at Models.com.
Lia Pavlova on Instagram.
Lia Pavlova in VK (personal page)

1994 births
Living people
Russian female models
Female models from Saint Petersburg
Twin models
Next Management models